North Union may refer to:

North Union Railway, a British railway company formed in 1834
North Union, Indiana, an unincorporated community
North Union Township, Pennsylvania (disambiguation)
North Union Township, Fayette County, Pennsylvania
North Union Township, Schuylkill County, Pennsylvania
North Union High School (disambiguation)

See also
Union North